North-East Fremantle was an electoral district of the Legislative Assembly in the Australian state of Western Australia from 1911 to 1950.

Based in urban Fremantle, the district was first contested at the 1911 state election, being an amalgam of the former districts of North Fremantle and East Fremantle. Its first member was William Angwin of the Labor Party, formerly the member for East Fremantle. The district ceased to exist at the 1950 state election, when Labor member John Tonkin transferred to the new district of Melville. Tonkin later became Premier of Western Australia from 1971 to 1974.

Members

Election results

North-East Fremantle
1911 establishments in Australia
Constituencies established in 1911
1950 disestablishments in Australia
Constituencies disestablished in 1950